Thomas L. Knauff (born 1938) is an American writer, glider pilot, flight instructor, former Federal Aviation Administration (FAA)  Designated Pilot Examiner, and a member of the U.S. Soaring Hall of Fame. He was an early pioneer of ridge soaring in the Ridge-and-valley Appalachians in the 1960s, ultimately setting five world records flying gliders there. He was the stunt pilot in the 1999 film The Thomas Crown Affair.

Knauff was the first glider pilot to fly 750 km and 1000 km triangle course flights in the United States, and was the first to fly 1000 km with a passenger. His 1,647 km (1,023 mi) out-and-return flight in 1983 was the world's longest glider flight at the time, stood as a world record for nearly 20 years, and is still a U.S. national record. He has set more than 50 other U.S. National soaring records.

His glider flight training manuals, Glider Basics from First Flight to Solo and Glider Basics from Solo to License are the most popular in the U.S., and he is one of the most respected glider flight instructors in the world. He was one of the few FAA designated pilot examiners who are authorized to issue initial flight instructor certificates. 

Knauff currently lives near State College, Pennsylvania with his wife Doris Grove, another hall of fame glider pilot. They own and operate the Ridge Soaring Gliderport in Julian, Pennsylvania, which they founded in 1975.

World glider records
Knauff has set the following records:
Single-place glider
Out-and-return distance: , 25 April 1983, Schempp-Hirth Nimbus 3
Distance over a triangular course: , 2 May 1986, Schempp-Hirth Nimbus 3
Free distance using up to 3 turn points: , 1 June 1993, Schempp-Hirth Discus B
Two-place glider
Out-and-return distance: , 7 April 1979, IAR IS-28B2 "Lark"
Out-and-return distance: , 28 September 1981, Grob Twin Astir II

Other flying accomplishments
Knauff's other accomplishments include:
 Over 50 U.S. national gliding records
 World/National gliding competitions
 Kronfield Challenge Cup 1991 (First American)
 Eaton Trophy (with Doris Grove) 2000
 du Pont Trophy 1989
 Stroukoff Trophy 1989
 SSA Exceptional Achievement Award 1986
 FAI 1000K Diploma #15 (Int #31) 1980

Books

Knauff has written the following books:
Accident Prevention Manual for Glider Flight Instructors, with Doris Grove, 2nd edition, 1993, (No ISBN)
Accident Prevention Manual for Glider Pilots, with Doris Grove, 1992.
After Solo, 1995, 
Cockpit Guide for Glider CFI's
Glider Basics from First Flight to Solo, 5th edition, 1993, 
Glider Basics from Solo to License [edited by Allan Northcut and Norm Gilmore ; drawings by Robert Fitch]. 1st ed, 1984. 
Glider Emergency Procedures
Glider Flight Instructor Manual, 2001
Judgment Training Manual for Glider Pilots, with Doris Grove, 1985. OCLC 61776977
Judgment training manual for glider flight instructors, 1986. OCLC 61776976
Off Field Landings, 1993 
Ridge Soaring the Bald Eagle Ridge, 1987
The Bronze Badge Book
Transition to Gliders : A Flight Training Handbook for Power Pilots .2nd ed., 1990, 1984,

References

1938 births
Living people
American aviators
American aviation writers
American information and reference writers
American instructional writers
Aviation pioneers
Glider flight record holders
Glider pilots
Gliding in the United States
People from State College, Pennsylvania
American aviation record holders
American flight instructors